Kandeh Sang is a village in Baghlan Province in north eastern Afghanistan.

It lies several miles west of Dushi.

See also 
Baghlan Province

References

External links 
Satellite map at Maplandia.com 

Populated places in Baghlan Province